Lancaster County Christian School (LCCS) is a private, non-denominational Christian school in Lancaster County, Pennsylvania, United States.  It was founded in 2010, with the merger of Lancaster Christian School (founded in 1954) and Living Word Academy (founded in 1981). Lancaster County Christian School offers educational options for preschool through 12th grade.

Lancaster County Christian School's faith-based curriculum includes the inerrancy of the Bible, the triune nature of God, creationism, the divinity and virgin birth of Jesus Christ, a sola fide soteriology, and the ministry of the Holy Spirit.

References

External links

Christian schools in Pennsylvania
Education in Lancaster, Pennsylvania
Religion in Lancaster, Pennsylvania
Educational institutions established in 2010
Schools in Lancaster County, Pennsylvania
Private high schools in Pennsylvania
Private middle schools in Pennsylvania
Private elementary schools in Pennsylvania
2010 establishments in Pennsylvania